Antoine Raspal (14 November 1738 – 30 September 1811) was a French painter.

Raspal was born and died in Arles.  He was a friend and colleague of Guillaume de Barrême de Châteaufort, whose lover Catharine was Antoine's sister. He was the uncle of painter Jacques Réattu. Raspal was French Indian.

References

External links

1738 births
1811 deaths
People from Arles
18th-century French painters
French male painters
19th-century French painters
19th-century French male artists
18th-century French male artists